The Hurricane Festival, also just Hurricane, is a music festival that has taken place at the Eichenring, a speedway race track, in Scheeßel, Germany, since 1997. With more than 80,000 attendees (2022) it is one of the largest music festivals in Germany. Southside Festival, often referred to as Hurricane's "sister" festival, takes place on the same three days and has largely the same line-up. Alongside Southside Festival, Hurricane festival is organised by FKP Konzertproduktionen, MCT Agentur and KoKo Konstanz and takes place every June. Like many other large festivals Hurricane Festival plays a mix of rock, alternative, pop and electro music from established as well as emerging artists. Arrival begins at midday on the Thursday.

History

The 1973 and 1977 festivals
The first festival in Scheeßel took place on 8 and 9 September 1973 and was called "Es rockt in der Heide" (English: It's rocking in the heath). The festival hosted many of the big names in rock music at the time (Chuck Berry, Jerry Lee Lewis, Chicago, Manfred Mann's Earth Band, Lou Reed) and carried on through Monday night thanks to the enthusiasm of the bands.

The 1977 festival, this time called First Rider Open Air, which took place on 3 and 4 September incurred damage costs of 1.5 Million when the organiser who realised during the planning stages that it wouldn't be possible to pay the bands, ran off with the rest of the money. The name "First Rider Open Air" is a reference to the packaging for Rider in Blue Jeans rolling tobacco which was new at the time. The Dutch tobacco manufacturer Douwe Egberts sponsored the festival DM140.000 under the condition that the name of the tobacco was used. Some of the bands that had been announced including Nektar and The Byrds did not even arrive in Scheeßel in some cases it was because the payment of travel expenses had not been ensured and in other cases it was due to the fact the extremely inexperienced event organiser (a 25 year old bank clerk) had already paid in advance some bands in full who then did not turn up at all. Dutch band Long Tall Ernie & The Shakers opened on the first night which then ended with Golden Earring playing their song Radar Love. Hells Angels who were hired as stewards collectively abandoned their duties due to a lack of payment. After a while the fans who felt conned and the stewards who had been cheated of their pay set the stage and the organiser's trailers on fire. Equipment and instruments were destroyed. In addition to those already mentioned bands Van der Graaf Generator and Colosseum II and British progressive rock group Camel also performed. Electro artist Klaus Schulze had also been ready to go on stage and perform before the fire. Originally Steppenwolf and Ray Manzarek (the pianist from The Doors) had been set to perform. Some people were injured from falling parts of the steel scaffolding. Those affected were then immediately dealt with by the emergency services. Following the major's orders the rock festival in Scheeßel was temporarily terminated.

Reestablishment 1997
In 1997 a festival in Scheeßel was resumed under a new city mayor and renamed Hurricane Festival. With the help of a local company, the event organiser Folkert Koopmans (FKP Scorpio) succeeded in convincing the Scheeßel city administration to resume the festival. Around 20.000 people attended the first Hurricane Festival on 21 and 22 June 1997 where the headliners were Rammstein, INXS and Bad Religion; the event did not make any profit. Koopmans had calculated that if there were 12.000 attendees then he would break even. 36 bands performed over the two days across two stages, a main stage and a smaller one which were both in tents. Since there were 9.000 more attendees than expected who wanted to stay over night on the site, land from the neighbouring farm was converted last minute to camping grounds.

Attendance increase and extension of the site
In only its second year the number of attendees at the festival was more than double that of the first, with a total of 40.000 and over the following years it would could continue to increase. A new record was reached in 2002 with 52.000 attendees. During the initial years (the exception being 2000) bands played over two days (Saturday and Sunday) but since 2003 the festival has taken place over three days (Friday, Saturday and Sunday).

In 2004 a second open-air stage was built opposite the other which caused an unpleasant sound cross-over. The same year David Bowie performed at the festival. After his performance Bowie complained of having difficulties with his heart and underwent emergency operation in Hamburg overnight. His performance at the sister festival Southside was subsequently cancelled. His performance at Hurricane was the last time Bowie performed live. Except for the occasional guest performance, Bowie made no more stage appearances before his death in January 2016.

In 2005 the festival sold out, selling more than 60.000 tickets, however, some attendees complained about this because it meant the camping area as well as the grounds themselves were overcrowded. As a result, the following year the number of tickets sold was reduced to 50.000; they sold out two months before the festival. For safety reasons crowd surfing was also forbidden. 
90 minutes before the official end of the 2006 festival saw the worst storm the festival has experienced to date. Gusts with wind force of 11 and rainfall up to 30 litres per square metre meant the festival had to be abandoned and damaged numerous tents and pavilions. Parts of the camping area was knee high under water and therefore led many attendees to find emergency shelter in the disco tent.
Owing to an increase in area both for camping and for the stages the number of tickets for 2007 was raised back to 60.000. The second stage (the blue stage) was moved out of the Eichenring. In 2008 the festival sold out shortly before the date, this time with 70.000 attendees.

Developments since 2009
In 2009 Hurricane did not sell out for the first time in a while. Headliners of the 13th festival on the Green Stage were Kings of Leon, Faith No More and Die Ärzte and on the Blue Stage Kraftwerk, Nick Cave and the Bad Seeds and Nine Inch Nails were the main acts. Faith No More's performance was one of only a handful in Europe and some fans travelled from Greece, the UK and Australia to be there.

In 2010 a fourth stage was built, the White Stage, which is reserved for Electro music.

Since 2011 festival goers have been able to use a mobile app (on Android and iOS) to access information on the bands (performance times, stages and other info) as well receive updates on the festival. It is also possible to receive information by text. In 2011 a mobile phone charging service was offered to campers with no source of electricity as a form of advertising and attracted long queues and in the same year a "Green" camping area was also available for the first time.

In 2012 the Red Stage which had only been introduced a few years before was no longer inside a tent but became the third open-air stage instead. The festival sold out at the beginning of May. 
2013 saw a record in the sale of tickets during the first stages of release as all 73.000 tickets were already sold by the end of March.

Since 2013 Spanish artist Dani Blázquez has created each year a new design for Hurricane. In 2013 it was a pink owl, 2014 a blue wolf, 2015 a green boar, 2016 a red fox, 2017 a green bear, 2018 a purple lynx and in 2019 a green racoon. The stylish animal's eye colour differs from the eye colour used in the designs at Hurricane's sister festival Southside. The design is used: to display on the stage screen when no acts are performing; as the wallpaper for the Hurricane-App and on the internet; as well as in many places around the festival grounds on banners.

After the 2014 festival also sold out before the weekend, selling 73.000 Combitickets, 2015 was the first non sell-out in several years with around 65.000 attendees. According to the organisers this was due to the strong competition from other festivals that year and the subsequent weaker headliner line-up (Placebo, Florence + the Machine, Materia). In addition in the same year an elaborate contactless payment system was used on site rather than cash.

On 23 February 2016, the event organisers announced that all 73.000 Combitickets for that year's festival had sold out. On the very first day of the festival there was a two-hour disruption due to a thunder storm warning. The event organisers were particularly aware after a lightning strike injured 21 people at the festival Rock am Ring, which was then terminated early. On the second day of the festival the opening of the festival grounds was initially delayed and then later in the evening completely cancelled. During the night of 25 June 2016 along with specialist groups from the THW, Technisches Hilfswerk (a German governmental civil protection group), the fire service and some staff, the organisers of the event drained the land, they pumped water away and distributed straw and gravel. The site was then able to be open as normal on the Sunday.

Facts and figures

Past lineups
(lineups partly differ from Southside)

See also

List of historic rock festivals

References

External links

 The Hurricane Festival's homepage (German)
 The Hurricane Festival's homepage (English)
 Homepage of FKP Scorpio, the organizer
 Hurricane Festival 2007 on Internet Movie Database
 Hurricane Festival 2010 All Bands and Stages (German)

Rock festivals in Germany
Electronic music festivals in Germany
Music festivals established in 1973
Indie rock festivals